Mazan is a commune in the Vaucluse department in the Provence-Alpes-Côte d'Azur region in southeastern France.  The town is 4 miles (7 km) drive east of Carpentras, one of its neighbouring municipalities, and 21 miles (34 km) by road from Avignon.

The town is located in the heart of the former Venaissin County, near the south side of Mount Ventoux.

Mazan is one of the chateaux of the de Sade family. Today this chateau is a luxury hotel.

Population

See also
Communes of the Vaucluse department

References

Communes of Vaucluse